The Taipei City Walls were constructed in 1884 in Taipeh Prefecture, Taiwan, Qing dynasty (modern-day Taipei, Taiwan). Shortly after the Qing dynasty established Taipeh Prefecture in 1875, Prefect Chen Hsing-chü (陳星聚) ordered the foundation of a new prefectural capital with enclosing walls in 1879. However the soil proved too soft to support so heavy a structure, and the project was halted.  Subsequently, governor of Fujian Cen Yu-ying (岑毓英) and Taiwan magistrate Liu Ao (劉璈) undertook successive surveys to determine the proper location of the wall's foundations. Craftsmen were recruited for the construction in 1882, and the wall was completed in 1884.

The North Gate, the Auxiliary South Gate, and the buttresses of the East Gate were of particularly exquisite design.

In the first years of the Japanese colonial rule (ca. 1895), the city's walls and the West Gate were destroyed as part of the city's restructuring plan. After the handover of Taiwan from Japan to the Republic of China in 1945, the East, South, and Auxiliary South Gates were rebuilt, but the original appearances were not maintained. The North Gate alone retains its original appearance.  Its design is a 2-story closed blockhouse of solid construction with traditional Chinese wooden roof truss and streamlined carved ornamentations.

Gallery

See also
 Taiwan under Qing rule
 Ximen metro station
 Beimen metro station
 Dongmen metro station
 Chiang Kai-shek Memorial Hall metro station

References

References

External links

1884 establishments in China
Buildings and structures completed in 1884
Buildings and structures in Taipei
Taipei
History of Taipei
National monuments of Taiwan